Rocket Boy and Toro is a cartoon series that originally aired on CBBC in 2008 to 2009. The show was set in space and the main characters consisted of Rocket Boy, Chrystella, Vector, Grandpa Sat, and Toro, Rocket Boy's sheep assistant. In the UK, the show only aired for two years and has not aired since. However, reruns continue to this day of the series, dubbed into Arabic, on Basma channel in the Arab world.
 
The show is mainly about Rocket Boy and his friends delivering parcels to different galaxies and planets around space. During the course of the series they are always slowed down by his Archenemy Dr. Square the Sworn Enemy of the Galactic Parliament (an evil super computer with the brain the size of a planet), and his henchman, Trash (who always tends to fail his missions). Dr. Square is always trying to capture Rocket Boy so he can learn the secret of his speed, but no matter how hard he tries, Rocket Boy and his friends always seem to come out on top. Most of the original character design was handled by German animator Andreas Hykade.

The show was created by Korean animation studio Imagestone, Manchester-based Cosgrove Hall Films, and London-based Village Prods.

References

External links
 

2008 South Korean television series debuts
2000s animated television series
BBC children's television shows
British children's animated space adventure television series
South Korean children's animated television series
2008 British television series debuts
2009 British television series endings
Television series by Cosgrove Hall Films